The Indonesia women's cricket team toured the Philippines to play a four-match Women's Twenty20 International (WT20I) series that was played from 21 to 22 December 2019. Originally the tour was scheduled to be a tri-series, but Bahrain withdrew prior to the series. The matches were played at the Friendship Oval ground at the Emilio Aguinaldo College Cavite campus in the city of Dasmariñas.

The Philippines played their first WT20I matches since the International Cricket Council's (ICCs) announcement that full WT20I status would apply to all the matches played between women's teams of associate members after 1 July 2018. Eight of the cricketers in the Philippines women's squad were selected from Hong Kong's SCC Divas cricket team.

Indonesia won the series 4–0, with opening batters Yulia Anggraeni and Kadek Winda Prastini setting a world record WT20I partnership of 257 runs in the second game.

Squads

Fixtures

1st WT20I

2nd WT20I

3rd WT20I

4th WT20I

References

External links
 Series home at ESPNcricinfo

Cricket in the Philippines
2019 in women's cricket
Associate international cricket competitions in 2019–20